Ioan (or Ion) Bogolea (born 1940, died ?) was a Romanian handball player, who was double world champion. He was a goalkeeper.

After playing for Flamura Roșie Sighișoara, he transferred to Dinamo Bucharest.

He won the world championships twice with the Romanian team, in 1961 in Germany and in 1964 in Czekoslovakia.

He won a bronze medal in the World University Championship in Lund, Sweden in 1963.

As a member of Dinamo Bucharest he won, among others, the national championship and the EHF Champions League.

Awards
Master of Sport, 1961
Honored Master of Sport, 1964

References 

CS Dinamo București (men's handball) players
1940 births
People from Sighișoara
Year of death missing
Romanian male handball players